Bún ốc ("snail vermicelli soup") is a Vietnamese dish originating from Hanoi, Vietnam. Roasted or boiled snails (ốc luộc), may be eaten first as an appetizer. Snail congee is called cháo ốc, and canh ốc chuối đậu, is a thin snail soup with green banana, fried tofu and tía tô.

Introduction

Though it isn't known when this dish was first created, it is certainly one of the most typical dishes of Vietnamese cuisine.  It's speculated to have  come from a certain countryside, then followed the footsteps of immigrants to Thang Long citadel and became a specialty there.  A related dish called luosifen (snail noodles) is popular across the border in Guangxi, China.

The Hanoian often choose snails which are smaller and chewier than their land-based cousins. Fat and fresh snails are preferable, with rice noodles that were not soaked in water for too long. Cooks choose the best bun (rice noodle), which means thin and clear noodles. Bun oc not only contains broth, snails, and tofu as its basic characteristics but it can also contain green bananas, some fresh vegetables or chopped water spinach, bean sprouts, water dropwort, tomatoes, and other ingredients.

"giấm bỗng", a Vietnamese vinegar, is added for acidity and to highlight the taste, as well as a sweeter tomato broth. The ingredients are tangled white rice vermicelli noodles (similar to regular white rice vermicelli noodles but thinner) and boiled snails. Bún ốc can be served in two different ways: in its broth (called "hot snail noodles") or with broth in a separate bowl (called "cold snail noodles") with vegetables. The broth is made from stewed bones, tomatoes, and other ingredients. Cold snail noodles,  which are eaten by dipping the noodles in the broth, are a popular meal during the summer.

Shrimp paste and chili are optional, although purists like Vietnamese writer Vu Bang insist on adding those for a more piquant flavor. In Mon ngon Ha Noi by Vu Bang said "It is a gift, which can be said to have achieved the goal of culinary art of Hanoians."

Preparation
The first rule when buying snails is generally to choose alive snails. Dead snails have scales (flakes) that have already been indented, and alive snails only retract when touched. In addition, dead snails often smell. If we drop snails into a basin full of water, dead snails will rotate the bottom up, picking them up, they will be light. Snail after buying is not cooked immediately. To clean snails thoroughly, you should soak them overnight in rice water, after that, rubbing snail's shell by a brush under the water flow. Or you can drop a small iron knife into a pot of water soaked in snails. The smell of iron in water will stimulate snails to release mud and dirt faster and more thoroughly. 

Another way is to soak the snails with water mixed with vinegar or lime juice and chopped fresh chili for 2-3 hours. If soaked in this way, after picking up snails should be processed immediately to keep the taste fresh.

Gallery

See also
 Rice noodles

References

External links 
 Vietnam Cooking Experience - Soup with snails and tofu - Bún Ốc
 Down The Street and Back Again - 365 Food Experiences One Bite at a Time Here in Vietnam - Sampling Vietnam One Meal at a Time - Bún ốc snail noodle soup

Vietnamese cuisine
Tofu dishes
Snail dishes